The New York Yankees are a professional baseball team based in the Bronx, a borough of New York City. Also known as "the Bronx Bombers" and "the Pinstripers", the Yankees play in the East Division of Major League Baseball's (MLB) American League (AL). In its 120 MLB seasons, the franchise has won 27 World Series championships, the most of any MLB team and 16 more than the second-place St. Louis Cardinals. The Yankees played home games in Yankee Stadium from 1923 to 2008, except for a stint at Shea Stadium from 1974 to 1975 while Yankee Stadium was undergoing renovations. In 2009, the team moved into a new ballpark, which is also called Yankee Stadium.

The Baltimore Orioles began play in the AL in 1901. After two seasons, the Orioles were replaced by a club in New York; it is unclear whether it was an expansion team or a relocated version of the Orioles. Frank Farrell and William S. Devery purchased the franchise, naming it the New York Highlanders. In 1913, the team changed its name to the Yankees. From 1921 to 1964, the Yankees were the most successful MLB franchise, winning 20 World Series titles and 29 AL pennants. This period included streaks of four consecutive championships from 1936 to 1939 and five straight titles from 1949 to 1953.

Following an 11-year playoff drought, the club appeared in the playoffs five times in a six-year period and won back-to-back World Series championships in 1977 and 1978. The Yankees won the World Series again in 1996, and in 1998 began a run of three consecutive titles. From 1995 to 2007, the Yankees made the playoffs each year; their 13-season postseason streak was the second-longest in MLB history. After missing the playoffs in 2008, they won another World Series in 2009 and reached the postseason each year from 2010 to 2012. In the most recent MLB season, 2022, New York had a 99–63 record and lost to the Houston Astros in the American League Championship Series. Overall, the Yankees' .570 regular season winning percentage is the highest of any MLB team, and they have the eighth-most regular season wins, behind seven clubs founded in the 19th century.

Table key

Year by year

These statistics are from Baseball-Reference.com's New York Yankees Team History & Encyclopedia, except where noted, and are current as of October 24, 2022.

Record by decade 
The following table describes the Yankees' MLB win–loss record by decade.

These statistics are from Baseball-Reference.com's New York Yankees Team History & Encyclopedia, and are current as of October 24, 2022.

All-time records

Notes
This is determined by calculating the difference in wins plus the difference in losses divided by two.
For lists of all American League pennant winners, see American League pennant winners 1901–68 and American League Championship Series.
Half-game increments are possible because games can be cancelled due to rain. If a postponed game is the last of the season between two teams in one of their stadiums, it may not be made up if it does not affect the playoff race.
The second game of the series ended after 10 innings due to darkness, with the score tied 2–2.
During Game 3 of this series, Babe Ruth hit his called shot, a home run into the center field bleachers of Wrigley Field.
Don Larsen pitched the only perfect game in World Series history in Game 5.
In 1969, the American League split into East and West divisions.
The 1972 Major League Baseball strike forced the cancellation of the Yankees' first seven games of the season.
The Yankees finished the season tied for first with the Boston Red Sox. New York defeated the Red Sox 5–4 in a one-game playoff to clinch the division title. The game is best remembered for Bucky Dent's three-run home run in the seventh inning, which gave the Yankees a 3–2 lead.
The 1981 Major League Baseball strike caused the season to be split into two halves. The Yankees were given a berth in an expanded playoff tournament because they led the American League East when the strike began. The Milwaukee Brewers finished the second half in first place to earn the division's other playoff berth.
The 1994–95 Major League Baseball strike, which started on August 12, 1994, led to the cancellation of the playoffs and World Series. As a result of the abbreviated season, MLB did not officially award division championships. The Yankees led the American League East, and held the best record in the American League, at the time of the strike,
The 1994–95 MLB strike lasted until April 2, 1995, causing the shortening of the 1995 season to 144 games.
The Yankees finished the season tied for first with the Boston Red Sox, but were awarded the division title because they won the season series with the Red Sox.
The Yankees finished the season tied for third with the Baltimore Orioles.
The 2020 season was shortened to 60 games by the COVID-19 pandemic.
The Yankees finished the season tied for second with the Boston Red Sox. Since both teams qualified for the American League Wild Card Game, the tie had to be broken to determine home-field advantage. The Red Sox were designated the first wild card, and the Yankees were designated the second wild card, based on the Red Sox having won the season series between the teams, 10 games to 9.

References
General

Specific

Major League Baseball teams seasons
Seasons